Guk, also sometimes known as tang, is a class of soup-like dishes in Korean cuisine. Guk and tang are commonly grouped together and regarded as the same type of dish, although tang can sometimes be less watery than guk. It is one of the most basic components in a Korean meal, along with bap (밥, rice), and banchan (반찬, side dishes). In Korean table setting, guk is served on the right side of bap (rice), and left side of sujeo (수저, a spoon and chopsticks).

Guk is a native Korean word, while tang is a Sino-Korean word that originally meant "boiling water" or "soup". Tang has been used as an honorific term in place of guk, when it denotes the same meaning as guk as in yeonpo-tang (연포탕, octopus soup), daegu-tang (대구탕, codfish soup), or jogae-tang (조개탕, clam soup). Generally, the names of lighter soups with vegetables are suffixed with -guk, while heavier, thicker soups made with more solid ingredients used in jesa (ancestral rites) are often referred to as tang. Gamja-guk (potato soup) and gamja-tang (pork back-bone stew) are different dishes; the potato soup can be called gamjeo-tang.

Types
Guk is largely categorized into four groups of soups, such as malgeun jangguk (맑은 장국), gomguk (곰국), tojangguk (토장국), and naengguk (냉국). Malgeun jangguk literally means "clear (malgeun, 맑은) soup (guk, 국) seasoned with a condiment (jang, 장)," such as doenjang (soy bean paste) or ganjang, and is served in a bansang (반상, regular meal table). The main ingredients for malgeun jangguk are meat, fish, vegetables, and seafoods. Gomguk, also called gomtang, refers to either a soup type made by boiling various beef parts such as rib, oxtail, brisket, head, and so forth for a long time, or made with ox bone by the same method. The broth of gomguk tends to have a milky color and to be rich and hearty taste. It can also be made with chicken or pork bone, to produce samgyetang or gamjatang.

Tojangguk are based on doenjang broth and ssaltteumul (쌀뜨물, leftover water after washing rice for cooking). The taste is usually savory and deep. Naengguk are cold soups usually eaten in summer. These soups are usually clean and tangy, such as with oi naengguk (오이냉국, cold cucumber) and miyeok naengguk (미역냉국, cold wakame soup). Kkaetguk (깻국, sesame soup), made with chicken and sesame seeds, is thick and serves to replenish and supplement nutrients during hot weather.

Malgeun jangguk

 Tteokguk, tteok (rice cake) soup
 Miyeok guk, wakame (edible seaweed) soup
 Kongnamul guk, made with kongnamul
 Muguk, made with radish
 Gamjaguk, made with potato
 Toranguk, made with taro
 Bugeoguk, made with dried Alaska pollock
 Bogeoguk, made with puffer fish
 Jogaeguk, made with shellfish
 Jaecheopguk, soup made with jaecheop (small clams, Corbicula fluminea) harvested in rivers of Gyeongsang-do

Gomguk

 Beef
  Gomguk/gomtang (/):
 Sagol gomtang (사골곰탕), pale-bone broths garnished with oxtail or sliced brisket
 Kkori gomtang (꼬리곰탕), ox tail soup
 Seolleongtang (설렁탕): ox leg bone soup simmered for more than 10 hours until the soup is milky-white. Usually served in a bowl containing somyeon and pieces of beef.  Sliced scallions and black pepper are used as condiments
 Galbitang, made with galbi or beef ribs
 Yukgaejang (육개장), beef soup with red chili flakes, soy sauce and bean sprouts
 Doganitang, soup from knuckles and bones
 Chicken and pork
 Samgyetang (삼계탕), a soup made with Cornish game hens that are stuffed with ginseng, a hedysarum, glutinous rice, jujubes, garlic, and chestnuts; the soup is traditionally eaten in the summer
 Gamjatang (감자탕, "potato stew"), a spicy soup made with pork spine, vegetables (especially potatoes), and hot peppers; the vertebrae are usually separated, and the dish is often served as a late night snack but may also be served for lunch or dinner
 Dwaeji gukbap (돼지국밥), a representative regional hearty pork-parts soup with rice of coastal Gyeongsang-do

Tojangguk

Tojangguk are eaten all year round. The term emerged in the 1930s in Korean cookbooks.
 Sigeumchi tojangguk (시금치토장국), made with spinach
 Auk tojangguk (아욱토장국), made with malva
 Naengi tojangguk (냉이토장국), made with horseradish
 Ugeojiguk (우거지국), made with ugeoji (우거지, dried napa cabbage)
 Daseulgiguk (다슬기국), made with freshwater snails (다슬기, Semisulcospira libertina)

Naengguk

Naengguk refers to all kinds of cold soups, mainly eaten in summer. They are also called changuk (literally "cold soup") in pure Korean while the term naengguk is a combination of a Hanja word and a pure Korean word with the same meaning. The first historical record on naengguk appears in a poem written by Yi Gyu-bo (1168–1241), a high officer of the Goryeo period (918–1392). Naengguk is referred to as "sungaeng" in the poem, which literally means sunchaeguk, soup made with sunchae (Brasenia schreberi). Yi praised its clear and plain taste.

Naengguk is generally divided into two categories according to taste and ingredients. One group of naengguk is made by mixing chilled water and vinegar to give a sweet and sour taste; examples include miyeok naengguk made with wakame, oi naengguk made with cucumber, pa naengguk made with spring onions, nameul naengguk made with garlic, and gim naengguk made with gim or nori. The other group is made to supplement health and has rich tastes, such as chilled soup made with chicken, sesame, or soy bean.
 Miyeok naengguk (미역냉국), cold wakame soup
 Oi naengguk (오이냉국), cold cucumber soup
 Kkaetguk (깻국), hearty cold soup made with chicken and ground sesame seeds 
 Naengkongguk (냉콩국), made with ground soybeans  and can be used for kongguksu
 Kongnamul naengguk (콩나물냉국), made with kongnamul

Ingredients
 Maeuntang (매운탕): a refreshing, hot and spicy fish soup.
 Haejangguk (해장국): a favorite hangover cure consisting usually of meaty pork spine, ugeoji (우거지 dried napa cabbage) coagulated ox blood (similar to blood pudding), and vegetables in a hearty beef broth; legend has it that soon after World War II, the restaurant that invented this stew was the only place open in the Jongno district when the curfew at the time lifted at 4:00 AM
 Haemultang (해물탕): made with various seafood
 Haemuljaptang (해물잡탕), made with seafood and beef offal, once part of the Korean royal court cuisine
 Altang (알탕): can be made with myeongran jeot (명란젓), salted and fermented Alaska pollack's roe seasoned with chili pepper or fresh roe
 Chueotang (추어탕): made with Misgurnus mizolepis
 Yongbongtang (용봉탕): made with chicken, carp and softshell turtle
 Manduguk (만두국): mandu soup
 Wanjatang (완자탕): made with wanja (meatball-like jeon)
 Gyerantang (계란탕): soup made with eggs
 Ssukkuk (쑥국): made with ssuk (Artemisia princeps var. orientalis)
 Sundaeguk (순댓국): made with Sundae (or pork blood sausage) and sometimes it includes fatty pieces of intestine (gopchang), liver, lungs, bits of cartilage, and meat.

Gukbap
Gukbap (국밥) are dishes developed from guk. The term literally means "soup with rice." The dish is typically served in restaurants, and has become popular among the working class since the late Joseon Dynasty.
 Kongnamul gukbap (콩나물국밥), clear soybean sprout (kongnamul) soup with rice
 Gul-gukbap (굴국밥) – oyster and rice soup.
 Ttaro gukbap (따로국밥), a variety of yukgaejang, local specialty of Daegu

See also

 Jeongol
 Jjigae
 List of soups

References

Further reading

External links
Soups and stews from Food in Korea

Korean words and phrases